Brasileira is a municipality in the state of Piauí in the Northeast region of Brazil.

The municipality contains part of the  Serra da Ibiapaba Environmental Protection Area, created in 1996.
It contains 26% of the  Sete Cidades National Park, created in 1961.

See also
List of municipalities in Piauí

References

Municipalities in Piauí